Elections to South Ayrshire Council took place on 5 May 2022 on the same day as the 31 other Scottish local government elections. Despite shedding almost a quarter of their vote and coming second in the popular vote, the Conservatives retained their position as the largest party returning 10 councillors - two less than in the previous election. Both the Scottish National Party (SNP) – who topped the popular vote – and Labour made no gains or losses to remain as the second and third parties respectively. The number of independents returned increased from two to four.

Following the election the Conservatives formed a minority administration, replacing the previous SNP-Labour-Independent administration which was formed as a result of the previous election in 2017.

Background

Previous election

At the previous election in 2017, the Conservatives won the most seats returning 12 councillors. The Scottish National Party (SNP) maintained their position as the second-largest party while boundary changes saw Labour lose out as they lost four seats to return five councillors. Two independents were also returned.

Source:

Electoral system
The election used the eight wards created under the Local Governance (Scotland) Act 2004, with 28 councillors elected. Each ward elected either three or four members, using the STV electoral system where candidates are ranked in order of preference.

Composition
There was one change to the composition of the council following the previous election in 2017. Conservative councillor Hugh Hunter was de-selected in the run-up to the 2022 elections and resigned from the party to stand as an independent.

Retiring Councillors

Source:

Candidates
The total number of candidates increased from 45 in 2017 to 61 mainly due to the increased number of parties contesting the election. Unlike the previous vote, the Conservatives fielded the highest number of candidates at 19 – seven more than they had in 2017. Both the SNP and Labour also fielded at least one candidate in every ward but the 13 candidates fielded by the SNP and the eight fielded by Labour was one less than in 2017. The Liberal Democrats named six candidates in this election after fielding none in South Ayrshire in 2017. The number of independent candidates increased from nine in 2017 to 10 but the Greens did not contest the election as they did five years previous. Both the Scottish Family Party and the Alba Party fielded their first ever candidates in a South Ayrshire election.

Results

Source: 

Note: Votes are the sum of first preference votes across all council wards. The net gain/loss and percentage changes relate to the result of the previous Scottish local elections on 4 May 2017. This is because STV has an element of proportionality which is not present unless multiple seats are being elected. This may differ from other published sources showing gain/loss relative to seats held at the dissolution of Scotland's councils.

Ward summary

|- class="unsortable" align="centre"
!rowspan=2 align="left"|Ward
! %
!Cllrs
! %
!Cllrs
! %
!Cllrs
! %
!Cllrs
! %
!Cllrs
!rowspan=2|TotalCllrs
|- class="unsortable" align="center"
!colspan=2|Con
!colspan=2|SNP
!colspan=2|Lab
!colspan=2|Ind
!colspan=2|Others
|-
|align="left"|Troon
|bgcolor="#add8e6"|37.3
|bgcolor="#add8e6"|2
|35.9
|1
|19.2
|1
|2.8
|0
|4.7
|0
|4
|-
|align="left"|Prestwick
|25.5
|1
|bgcolor="#efe146"|34.8
|bgcolor="#efe146"|1
|15.4
|1
|23.2
|1
|1.2
|0
|4
|-
|align="left"|Ayr North
|20.5
|1
|bgcolor="#efe146"|45.9
|bgcolor="#efe146"|2
|24.1
|1
|6.3
|0
|3.2
|0
|4
|-
|align="left"|Ayr East
|30.0
|1
|bgcolor="#efe146"|39.2
|bgcolor="#efe146"|1
|16.5
|1
|12.1
|0
|2.3
|0
|3
|-
|align="left"|Ayr West
|bgcolor="#add8e6"|39.6
|bgcolor="#add8e6"|2
|21.9
|1
|10.9
|0
|22.8
|1
|4.8
|0
|4
|-
|align="left"|Kyle
|bgcolor="#add8e6"|36.7
|bgcolor="#add8e6"|1
|33.9
|1
|23.0
|1
|colspan="2" 
|6.4
|0
|3
|-
|align="left"|Maybole, North Carrick and Coylton
|bgcolor="#add8e6"|35.5
|bgcolor="#add8e6"|1
|32.0
|1
|12.4
|0
|17.7
|1
|2.5
|0
|3
|-
|align="left"|Girvan and South Carrick
|28.0
|1
|24.9
|1
|8.8
|0
|bgcolor="#c0c0c0"|37.2
|bgcolor="#c0c0c0"|1
|1.2
|0
|3
|- class="unsortable" class="sortbottom"
!align="left"|Total
!32.6
!10
!33.4
!9
!16.3
!5
!15.3
!4
!2.2
!0
!28
|}

Source:

Seats changing hands
Below is a list of seats which elected a different party or parties from 2017 in order to highlight the change in political composition of the council from the previous election. The list does not include defeated incumbents who resigned or defected from their party and subsequently failed re-election while the party held the seat.

Notes

Ward results

Troon
The Conservatives (2), the SNP (1) and Labour (1) retained the seats they won at the previous election.

Prestwick
The Conservatives held one of the two seats they won at the previous election and lost one to independent candidate Hugh Hunter while the SNP and Labour retained the seats they had won at the previous election. In 2017, Hugh Hunter was elected as a Conservative candidate.

Ayr North
The SNP (2), Labour (1) and the Conservatives (1) retained the seats they had won at the previous election.

Ayr East
The SNP, Labour and the Conservatives retained the seats they won at the previous election.

Ayr West
The Conservatives retained two of the three seats they won at the previous election and lost one to independent candidate Bob Shields while the SNP retained their only seat.

Kyle
The SNP, Labour and the Conservatives retained the seats they won at the previous election.

Maybole, North Carrick and Coylton
The SNP, the Conservatives and independent candidate Brian Connolly retained the seats they won at the previous election.

Girvan and South Carrick
Independent candidate Alec Clark, the SNP and the Conservatives held the seats they won at the previous election.

Aftermath
It had initially been expected that the ruling SNP-Labour-Independent administration would continue to run the council, but discussions broke down between the parties amid Labour's claims of a "political stitch-up". As a result, the SNP planned to run the council as a minority administration on a "collaboration and consensus basis". However, the Conservative group formed a minority administration and took control of the council after the first full-council meeting thanks to Labour abstentions. The party also had the support of two of the local authority's four independents.

References

2022
South Ayrshire
21st century in South Ayrshire